The Panama Conference was a meeting by the  Ministers of Foreign Affairs of the United States, Panama, Mexico, Ecuador, Cuba, Costa Rica, Peru, Paraguay, Uruguay, Honduras, Chile, Colombia, Venezuela, Argentina, Guatemala, Nicaragua, Dominican Republic, Brazil, Bolivia, Haiti and  El Salvador in Panama City at the Republic of Panama on September 23, 1939, shortly after the beginning of World War II in Europe.

Background 
US President Franklin D. Roosevelt had sought to aid Latin America by the non-interventionist Good Neighbor policy, but he soon became aware of the possibility of nations in the region turning to fascism, and he began efforts aimed at uniting the region against its influence. He called conferences, notably the 1936 Inter-American Conference for the Maintenance of Peace and 1938 Peru Conference. Despite opposition by Chile and Argentina, the Lima Declaration was unofficially agreed upon at Peru and stipulated that any country in the Americas could call for foreign ministers to attend a conference if it considered Latin America to be threatened.

Shortly after World War II began in Europe, a conference was called in Panama.

Conference 
The participants divided themselves into three sub-committees to discuss neutrality, the maintenance of peace in the area, and economic cooperation.

US citizens generally approved of the agreements reached at the conference.

See also 
Havana Conference (1940)
Pan-American Security Zone

References

Further reading

External links
Neutrality (Declaration of Panama), 3 October 1939

Military history of Panama during World War II
History of the foreign relations of the United States
20th-century diplomatic conferences
1939 in international relations
1939 in Panama
World War II conferences
1939 conferences
Foreign relations of Mexico
Foreign relations of El Salvador
Foreign relations of Honduras
Foreign relations of Nicaragua
Foreign relations of Cuba
Foreign relations of Peru
Foreign relations of Paraguay
Foreign relations of the Dominican Republic
Foreign relations of Chile
Foreign relations of Colombia
Foreign relations of Panama
Foreign relations of Brazil
Foreign relations of Ecuador
Foreign relations of Costa Rica
Foreign relations of Uruguay
Foreign relations of Venezuela
Foreign relations of Argentina
Foreign relations of Guatemala
Foreign relations of Bolivia
Foreign relations of Haiti